The Sierra Nevada, also known locally as the "Sierra",  is a mountain range running  north-to-south along eastern California, and occasionally into western Nevada. The name "Sierra Nevada" is Spanish, translating as "Snowy (Mountain) Range".

Geography
The Sierra Nevada's immense size in length and height, geological age, and wide variety of ecosystems and habitats present, make them home to one of the most diverse collections of distinct plant species in the United States.
The Sierras are bordered by: the Great Basin in rain shadow on the east; the Cascade Range on the north; the Central Valley—San Joaquin Valley on the west; the Tehachapi Mountains linking the Transverse Ranges on the southwest; and the Mojave Desert on the south.

Phytogeography
In phytogeography, concerned with the geographic distribution of plant species, floristic provinces are used. The Sierra Nevada are primarily within the California Floristic Province, with the Rocky Mountain Floristic Province to the north, the Great Basin Floristic Province to the east, and Sonoran Floristic Province to the south.

Biogeography
Biogeography looks at the spatial and temporal distributions of species. A descending hierarchy is used, with a realms at the top, then biomes, followed by smaller terrestrial ecoregions. The Sierra Nevada are a small part of the North American continental Nearctic realm. The Sierras contain portions of two Nearctic biomes:
The lower elevation western Sierra foothills are in the Nearctic Mediterranean forests, woodlands, and shrub biome: which is represented here by the California chaparral and woodlands ecoregion's  California interior chaparral and woodlands sub-ecoregion.
The valleys and mountains higher up are in the Nearctic temperate coniferous forests biome: which is represented here by the Sierra Nevada Forests ecoregion.

Plants and distributions
This list of native plants is organized by elevational distribution ranges and their plant communities. Some plants with a broader altitudinal range are found listed in their predominant habitat elevation.
All the plant species listed are native to the Sierra's foothills, valleys, and mountains. In addition some are also endemic to here and elsewhere within California - (ca-endemic); and some are further endemic to and only found in the Sierra Nevada - (sn-endemic).

Foothill Woodland and Chaparral Zone

Indicator species trees
 Pinus sabiniana - Gray Pine, California Foothill Pine
 Quercus douglasii - Blue Oak
 Other trees and shrubs
 Aesculus californica - California Buckeye
 Arbutus menziesii - Madrone
 Carpenteria californica - Bush anemone, Tree anemone (sn-endemic)
 Cercis occidentalis - Redbud
 Fraxinus latifolia - Oregon Ash
 Fremontodendron californicum - Fremontia, California Flannelbush
 Fremontodendron decumbens - Pine Hill Flannelbush   (sn-endemic),  endangered species
 Quercus garryana var. semota - Garry Oak
 Quercus lobata - Valley Oak
 Quercus wislizenii - Interior Live Oak
 Salix laevigata - Red Willow
 Salix lasiolepis - Arroyo Willow
 Chaparral
 Adenostoma fasciculatum - Chamise (dominant species)
 Arctostaphylos spp. - Manzanita
 Arctostaphylos mewukka - Indian Manzanita (sn-endemic)
 Arctostaphylos myrtifolia - Ione Manzanita (sn-endemic)
 Arctostaphylos nissenana - Nissenan manzanita (sn-endemic)
 Ceanothus spp. - California Lilac
 Ceanothus roderickii - Pine Hill Ceanothus (sn-endemic)
 Ceanothus tomentosus - Woollyleaf Ceanothus
 Heteromeles arbutifolia - Toyon
 Quercus berberidifolia - California Scrub Oak
 Quercus wislizenii - Interior Live Oak (scrub form)
 Rhamnus alnifolia - Alderleaf Buckthorn
 Rhamnus californica (Frangula californica) - Coffeeberry
 Rhamnus crocea - Redberry Buckthorn
 Ribes amarum - Bitter Gooseberry (ca-endemic)
 Ribes aureum - Golden Currant
 Ribes malvaceum - Chaparral Currant
 Ribes nevadense - Sierra Currant, Mountain Pink Currant
 Ribes roezlii - Sierra Gooseberry
 Rosa californica - California Wild Rose
 Salvia sonomensis - Sonoma Creeping Sage
 Wildflowers, herbaceous perennials, and others
 Allium obtusum - Red Sierra Onion, Subalpine onion
 Allium yosemitense - Yosemite onion (sn-endemic)
 Calochortus amoenus - Purple Fairy-lantern  (sn-endemic)
 Calochortus luteus - Yellow Mariposa Lily  (ca-endemic)
 Calochortus plummerae - Plummer's Mariposa Lily  (ca-endemic)
 Calochortus venustus - Butterfly Mariposa Lily  (ca-endemic)
 Carex tumulicola - Foothill Sedge
 Daucus pusillus - American Wild Carrot
 Eragrostis hypnoides - Teal Lovegrass
 Lomatium californicum - California Rock Parsnip
 Lomatium congdonii - Mariposa Desertparsley (sn-endemic)
 Lomatium stebbinsii - Stebbins' Desertparsley (sn-endemic)
 Lupinus stiversii - Harlequin Lupine  (ca-endemic)
 Monardella candicans - Sierra Monardella (sn-endemic)
 Melica aristata - Bearded Melicgrass  
 Melica californica - California Melic (bunchgrass)
 Melica harfordii - Harford's Oniongrass  (bunchgrass)
 Melica imperfecta - Little California Melic (bunchgrass)
 Mimulus bolanderi - Bolander's Monkeyflower  (ca-endemic)
 Mimulus congdonii - 'Congdon's Monkeyflower  (ca-endemic)
 Mimulus douglasii - Purple Mouse Ears
 Mimulus glaucescens - Shieldbract Monkeyflower  (ca-endemic)
 Mimulus gracilipes - Slenderstalk Monkeyflower   (sn-endemic)
 Mimulus inconspicuus - Smallflower Monkeyflower  (sn-endemic)
 Mimulus pulchellus - Yellowlip Pansy Monkeyflower  (sn-endemic)
 Mimulus shevockii - Kelso Creek Monkeyflower  (sn-endemic)
 Mimulus viscidus - Sticky Monkeyflower  (sn-endemic)
 Orthocarpus purpurascens - Owl Clover
 Packera layneae - Laynes butterweed, Layne's ragwort (sn-endemic)
 Wyethia helenioides - Gray Mule's Ears

Eastern Slopes Great Basin xeric zone
Trees and shrubs
 Artemisia tridentata - Sagebrush, Common Sagebrush
 Cercocarpus ledifolius - Curl-leaf Mountain Mahogany
 Juniperus osteosperma - Utah Juniper
 Pinus attenuata - Knobcone Pine
 Pinus monophylla - Single-leaf Pinyon
 Yucca brevifolia - Joshua Tree
Perennials, subshrubs, and grasses
 Agropyron desertorum - Desert Crested Wheatgrass (bunchgrass)
 Calochortus bruneaunis - Bruneau Mariposa Lily  
 Dodecatheon redolens - Scented Shooting Star
 Eriogonum latens - Inyo buckwheat
 Grayia spinosa - Spiny Hopsage
 Linanthus inyoensis - Inyo Gilia
 Mimulus bigelovii - Bigelow's Monkeyflower
 Mimulus whitneyi - Harlequin Monkeyflower   (sn-endemic)
 Muhlenbergia porteri - Bush Muhly
 Salvia dorrii - Purple Sage
 Sisyrinchium halophilum - Nevada Blue-eyed grass
 Sporobolus airoides - Alkali Sacaton  (bunchgrass)
 Sporobolus contractus - Spike Dropseed (bunchgrass)

Lower Montane Forest

Xeric-dry SW forests
Indicator species trees
 Pinus ponderosa - Ponderosa Pine, Yellow Pine - Yellow Pine Forest
 Pinus jeffreyi - Jeffrey Pine, Yellow Pine
Other trees
Calocedrus decurrens - Incense Cedar
 Fraxinus velutina - Modesto Ash (Very localized in the Southern Sierras)
 Pinus lambertiana - Sugar Pine
 Pseudotsuga menziesii - Douglas-fir
 Quercus kelloggii - California Black Oak
Canyon Live Oak
Arbutus menziesii - Pacific Madrone (Localized in the Central Sierras)
Mesic-moist NE forests
Indicator species trees
 Sequoiadendron giganteum - Giant Sequoia (sn-endemic)
 Pinus ponderosa - Ponderosa Pine
Other trees
 Abies concolor - White Fir
 Acer macrophyllum - Bigleaf Maple
 Acer negundo var. californicum - Box Elder
 Alnus incana subsp. tenuifolia - Grey Alder
 Alnus rhombifolia - White Alder
 Betula occidentalis - Water Birch
 Pinus lambertiana - Sugar Pine
 Populus trichocarpa - California poplar

Shrubs
 Amelanchier alnifolia var. pumila - Serviceberry
 Amelanchier utahensis - Utah Serviceberry
 Arctostaphylos manzanita - Whiteleaf Manzanita (ca-endemic)
 Arctostaphylos nevadensis - Pinemat Manzanita
 Arctostaphylos patula - Greenleaf Manzanita
 Arctostaphylos viscida subsp. mariposa &  subsp. viscida - Sticky Manzanita
 Berberis aquifolium - Oregon-Grape
 Berberis nervosa - Dwarf Oregon-Grape
 Ceanothus fresnensis - Fresno Mat (sn-endemic)
 Ceanothus parvifolius - Littleleaf Ceanothus (sn-endemic)
 Ceanothus pinetorum - Kern Ceanothus (sn-endemic)
 Chamaebatia foliolosa - Kit-kit-dizze, Bear Clover, Mountain Misery
 Cornus nuttallii - California Dogwood
 Prunus emarginata - Oregon Cherry
 Rhamnus ilicifolia - Hollyleaf Redberry
 Rhamnus rubra - Sierra Coffeeberry
 Ribes nevadense - Sierra Currant, Mountain Pink Currant
 Ribes roezlii - Sierra Gooseberry
 Ribes tularense - Sequoia Gooseberry, Tulare Gooseberry  (sn-endemic)
 Rhododendron occidentale - Western Azalea
 Rosa bridgesii - Pygmy Rose
 Rosa woodsii - Woods' Rose
 Salix spp. - Willows
 Salix drummondiana - Drummond's Willow
 Salix exigua - Sandbar Willow
 Salix lemmonii - Lemmon's Willow
 Salix ligulifolia - Strapleaf Willow
 Salix lucida  subsp. caudata,  subsp. lasiandra - Shining Willow, Pacific Willow, or Whiplash Willow
 Salix scouleriana - Scouler's Willow
 Umbellularia californica - California Bay

Herbaceous perennials and others
 Allium obtusum - Red Sierra Onion
 Andropogon glomeratus var. scabriglumis - Bushy Bluestem bunchgrass
 Aquilegia formosa - Western Columbine
 Blechnum spicant - Deer Fern
 Calochortus leichtlinii - Leichtlin's Mariposa Lily,  Smokey Mariposa Lily
 Calochortus westonii - Shirley Meadow Star-tulip (sn-endemic)
 Camissonia sierrae ssp. alticola – Mono Hot Springs Evening-primrose (sn-endemic)
 Carex spp. - Sedges
 Carex abrupta - Abrupt-beaked Sedge
 Carex amplifolia - Bigleaf Sedge
 Carex angustata - Widefruit Sedge
 Carex athrostachya - Slenderbeak Sedge
 Carex aurea - Golden Sedge
 Carex canescens
 Carex cusickii - Cusick's Sedge
 Carex diandra - Lesser Panicled Sedge
 Carex disperma - Softleaf Sedge
 Carex douglasii - Douglas' Sedge
 Carex echinata subsp. echinata - Star Sedge
 Carex filifolia var. erostrata  - Threadleaf Sedge
 Carex hassei - Salt Sedge
 Carex helleri''' - Heller's Sedge
 Carex heteroneura - var. epapillosa & heteroneura - Different-Nerve Sedge
 Carex hoodii - Hood's Sedge
 Carex illota - Sheep Sedge
 Carex jonesii - Jones' Sedge
 Carex lasiocarpa - Slender Sedge
 Carex lenticularis var. impressa &  lipocarpa  - Lakeshore Sedge
 Carex leporinella - Sierra Hare Sedge
 Carex limosa - Shore Sedge
 Carex luzulina  var. ablata,  var. luzulina - Woodrush Sedge
 Carex mariposana - Mariposa Sedge
 Carex multicaulis - Manystem Sedge
 Carex multicostata - Manyrib Sedge
 Carex nebrascensis - Nebraska Sedge
 Carex nervina - Sierra Sedge
 Carex nudata - California Black-Flowering Sedge
 Carex pellita - Woolly Sedge
 Carex petasata - Liddon Sedge
 Carex praegracilis - Field Sedge
 Carex rossii - Ross's Sedge
 Carex scoparia - Pointed Broom Sedge
 Carex sheldonii - Sheldon's Sedge
 Carex simulata - Analogue Sedge
 Carex straminiformis - Shasta Sedge
 Carex utriculata - Northwest Territory Sedge
 Carex vesicaria  var. major & vesicaria - Blister Sedge
 Epipactis gigantea - Stream Orchid
 Eragrostis pectinacea - Tufted lovegrass  (bunchgrass) Hesperostipa comata - Needle-and-Thread Grass  (bunchgrass) Iris hartwegii - Sierra Iris  (ca-endemic) Iris missouriensis - Western Blue Flag Iris
 Iris tenuissima - (ca-endemic) Koeleria macrantha - Prairie Junegrass  (bunchgrass) Lilium humboldtii  subsp. humboldtii - Humboldt's Lily   (ca-endemic) Lilium pardalinum subsp. pardalinum & shastense - Leopard Lily
 Lilium washingtonianum subsp. washingtonianum - Shasta Lily
 Luzula comosa - Pacific Woodrush
 Melica fugax - Little Oniongrass
 Melica geyeri - Geyer's Oniongrass
 Melica subulata - Alaska Oniongras
 Melica torreyana - Torrey's Melicgrass  (bunchgrass) - (ca-endemic) Mimulus aurantiacus - Sticky Monkey-flower
 Mimulus bicolor - Yellow and White Monkeyflower  (ca-endemic) Mimulus breviflorus - Shortflower Monkeyflower
 Mimulus cardinalis - Scarlet Monkeyflower
 Mimulus guttatus - Common Monkey-flower
 Mimulus montioides - Montia-like Monkeyflower  (sn-endemic) Monardella odoratissima - Mountain Coyote Mint
 Muhlenbergia asperifolia - Scratchgrass
 Pellaea brachyptera - Sierra Cliffbrake fern
 Pellaea breweri - Brewer's cliffbrake fern
 Pellaea bridgesii - Bridges' cliffbrake fern
 Pteridium aquilinum - Bracken Fern
 Sedum albomarginatum - Feather River Stonecrop (sn-endemic -  endangered) Sisyrinchium bellum - Californian Blue-eyed Grass
 Sisyrinchium elmeri - Elmer's Yellow-eyed Grass
 Sisyrinchium idahoense - Idaho Blue-eyed Grass
 Sporobolus vaginiflorus - Poverty Dropseed (bunchgrass) Streptanthus fenestratus - Tehipite Valley Jewelflower (sn-endemic) Xerophyllum tenax - Indian Basket Grass, Bear Grass

Upper Montane ForestIndicator species trees
 Abies magnifica - Red Fir
 Pinus contorta murrayana - Lodgepole Pine
Other trees
 Pinus monticola - Western White Pine
 Populus tremuloides - Quaking Aspen
 Juniperus occidentalis - Sierra Juniper
 Pinus jeffreyi - Jeffrey Pine
 Tsuga mertensiana - Mountain Hemlock
Shrubs
 Chrysolepis sempervirens - Bush Chinquapin
 Arctostaphylos patula - Greenleaf Manzanita
 Arctostaphylos nevadensis - Pinemat Manzanita
 Quercus vaccinifolia - Huckleberry Oak
 Ribes nevadense - Sierra Currant, Mountain Pink Currant
 Salix jepsonii - Jepson's Willow
 Salix arctica - Arctic Willow
Herbaceous perennials and others
 Allium obtusum - Red Sierra Onion, Subalpine onion
 Carex spp. - Sedges (see also Carex spp. "Lower Montane Forest") Carex specifica - Narrowfruit Sedge
 Elymus sierrae - Sierra Wild Rye  (sn-endemic) Erigeron aequifolius - Hall's Daisy (sn-endemic) Lilium parvum - Sierra Tiger Lily  (sn-endemic) Lomatium torreyi - Sierra Biscuitroot  (sn-endemic) Melica bulbosa - Oniongrass
 Mimulus filicaulis - Slender-stemmed Monkeyflower  (sn-endemic) Mimulus leptaleus - Slender Monkeyflower  (sn-endemic) Mimulus torreyi - Torrey's Monkeyflower (ca-endemic) Phacelia inyoensis - Inyo Phacelia  (sn-endemic) Poa cusickii - Cusick's Bluegrass
 Viola adunca - Western Dog Violet
 Viola glabella - Stream Violet
 Viola macloskeyi - Western Sweet-white Violet
 Woodwardia fimbriata - Giant Chain Fern

Saprophytes
 Sarcodes sanguinea - Snow Plant
 Pyrola picta - Shinleaf Wintergreen
 Pterospora andromedea - Pinedrop
 Corallorhiza - Coral roots
 Cephalanthera austiniae - Phantom Orchid

Subalpine ZoneIndicator species tree
 Pinus albicaulis - Whitebark Pine
Other trees, and shrubs:
 Pinus balfouriana subsp. austrina - Foxtail Pine
 Pinus flexilis - Limber Pine (eastern slopes) Pinus monticola - Western White Pine
 Juniperus occidentalis - Sierra Juniper
 Salix eastwoodiae - Mountain Willow (& alpine zone) Salix melanopsis - Dusky Willow
Herbaceous perennials and others:
 Allium obtusum - Subalpine onion
 Carex spectabilis - Showy Sedge
 Carex subnigricans - Nearlyblack Sedge (& alpine zone) Carex vernacula - Native Sedge
 Luzula divaricata - Forked Woodrush (& alpine zone) Luzula orestera - Sierra Woodrush (& alpine zone) Melica stricta - Rock Melic  (bunchgrass) - (& alpine zone) Mimulus laciniatus - Cutleaf Monkeyflower (sn-endemic) Poa leptocoma - Western Bog Bluegrass (& alpine zone)Alpine Zoneabove  Antennaria pulchella - Sierra Pussytoes
 Aquilegia pubescens - Sierra Columbine (sn-endemic) - (& sub-alpine zone) Carex capitata - Capitate Sedge
 Carex nigricans - Black Alpine Sedge
 Carex phaeocephala - Dunhead Sedge (& down to foothill woodlands zone) Carex raynoldsii - Raynolds' Sedge (& sub-alpine zone) Lomatium shevockii - Owens Peak Desert-parsley (sn-endemic) Muhlenbergia richardsonis - Mat Muhly
 Oxyria digyna - Mountain Sorrel
 Polemonium eximium - Sky pilot
 Ptilagrostis kingii - Sierra False Needlegrass (sn-endemic), (& sub-alpine zone) Salix orestera - Gray-leafed Sierra Willow (& sub-alpine zone) Salix planifolia subsp. planifolia- Tea-Leafed Willow (& sub-alpine zone)''

See also
 Ecology of the Sierra Nevada
 List of Giant Sequoia groves in the Sierra Nevada

References and bibliography
 Note: references for each plant species are within their own articles.
 Bibliography of the Sierra Nevada (U.S.)
 "A Natural History of California," Allan A. Schoenherr, University of California Press, 1992, .
 "A California Flora and Supplement," Phillip Munz, 1968, University of California Press, .
 "The Jepson Manual,"  James C. Hickman-editor, University of California Press, 2003, .
 "Mountain Sage: The Life of Carl Sharsmith, Yosemite Ranger and Naturalist," Elizabeth Stone O'Neill, .

External links

 Jepson Manual: Sierra Nevada Foothills -  flora checklist
 Jepson Manual: High Sierra Nevada - flora checklist
Yosemite Online Library—Natural History Books
California Native Plant Society: Identifying Native Plants website

 01
Plants
Sierra Nevada01
Sierra
+